Conchylodes erinalis is a moth in the family Crambidae. It was described by Francis Walker in 1859. It is found in South and Central America, including Mexico, Panama, Costa Rica, Belize and Venezuela.

References

Moths described in 1859
Spilomelinae